Sesleria caerulea, the blue moor-grass, is a species of perennial grass in the family Poaceae, native to Europe.

References 

 GrassBase entry
 
 Animadv. bot. spec. alt. 2:18, t. 6, fig. 3-5. 1764
 Foggi, B. et al. 2001. Nomenclatural notes and typification in Sesleria Scop. (Poaceae). Taxon 50:1101–1106.

caerulea